Jeremy Sosenko (born 1978) is an American screenwriter, actor, improviser, and director, best known for contributing to writing the 2013 pulp comedy Movie 43 and for writing for the cartoon TV show Brickleberry on Comedy Central. Sosenko was a writer and producer on Netflix's Paradise PD from 2018-2021.

References

External links

1978 births
American male dramatists and playwrights
American dramatists and playwrights
American male screenwriters
Date of birth missing (living people)
Living people